Shally Awasthi is an Indian professor and paediatric pulmonologist. She works at King George's Medical University, Lucknow, UP India.

Recognition 
Awasthi is an elected fellow of all major Indian science academies namely the National Academy of Science, Indian Academy of Sciences, The National Academy of Medical Science, Indian National Science Academy 2020  and Indian Academy of Pediatrics. She was an Honorary Fellow of Royal College of Pediatrics and Child Health for 2018.

The Department of Science and Technology Government of India honored her with its National Award for Outstanding Efforts in Science & Technology Communication through innovative and traditional methods in 2016. The Indian Council of Medical Research of the Government of India awarded her the Basanti Devi Amir Chand Award-2016, Amrut Mody Unichem Prize-2010, Dr HB Dingley Memorial Award-1996. The Medical Council of India awarded her the Bidhan Chandra Roy Award for 2003–2004., She has been awarded Mridula Kamboj Memorial Lecture Oration Award, NASI, 2020. She has been listed in the top 2% of scientists in Pediatrics

References

Living people
1958 births
20th-century Indian women scientists
20th-century Indian scientists